Merritt Tierce is an American short-story author, story editor, essayist, activist, and novelist. Tierce was born in Texas and attended the Iowa Writers' Workshop, receiving her MFA in Fiction in 2011. She previously taught at the University of Iowa. She was a founding board member of the Texas Equal Access Fund and previously worked as Executive Director of the TEA. She currently resides in Los Angeles and is a writer for Orange is the New Black.

Awards and honors 

 2019 Whiting Foundation Award
 2015 PEN Literary Awards Finalist
 2015 Texas Institute of Letters Steven Turner Award for First Fiction
 2013 National Book Foundation's 5 Under 35 Honoree
 2011 Rona Jaffe Foundation Writers' Award

Residencies 

 2017 MacDowell Colony Fellowship
2017 Willapa Bay Artist-in-Residence
 Can Cab Residency

Bibliography

Novels 

 Love Me Back. Doubleday Books. 2014. .

Short stories 

 "Casa Linda." D Magazine. 2017.
 "Calvin D. Colson." PEN America #19: Hauntings. 2016.
 "Solitaire." Oxford American. 2014.
 "Everything I Did in Madrid." H.O.W. Journal. 2014.
 "Suck It." Southwest Review and New Stories from the South: The Year's Best. 2008.

Essays 
 "The Abortion I Didn't Have." The New York Times Magazine. 2021.
 "Distributed Denial of Service." Granta. 2019. 
 "Author Merritt Tierce's Brief Stint as a Mailman." D Magazine. 2017. 
 "What to Read If You Care About Access to Abortion in Trump's America." LitHub. 2017.
 "At Sea." The Paris Review. 2016. 
 "I Published My Debut Novel to Critical Acclaim--And Then I Promptly Went Broke." Marie Claire. 2016. 
 "Why I'm Still Infuriated About Abortion Access in Texas." Cosmopolitan. 2016.
 "This is What an Abortion Looks Like." The New York Times. 2014. 
 "World Cup." Electric Lit. 2014.

Other work 
Tierce was a writer for seasons six and seven of Orange is the New Black.

Early life and education 
Tierce grew up in Texas in a strongly Christian household. She graduated from Abilene Christian University at 1997 with a Bachelors degree, age 19, having started college two years early. Slated to start a graduate program at Yale School of Divinity the next year, her plans changed due to a pregnancy and ensuing marriage to the father of her unborn child, an event she sardonically described as a child bride in a shotgun wedding. (She never went to Yale, but earned a Masters of Fine Arts from the Iowa Writers Workshop about fifteen years later.)

Tierce was unable to consider abortion due to her religious beliefs at the time (she had written and presented against it while unknowingly pregnant). She also couldn't consider giving up her first child to adoption, 

The couple had a second child, a daughter, about a year later. They eventually divorced, continued an amicable co-parenting. Tierce remarried around age 36, and has a stepdaughter.

References 

American short story writers
American essayists
Iowa Writers' Workshop alumni
University of Iowa faculty
Writers from Los Angeles
Novelists from Texas
Living people
Date of birth missing (living people)
American women short story writers
American women essayists
American women novelists
Novelists from California
Year of birth missing (living people)
American women academics